Terrance Arthur (Terry) Dance was a suffragan bishop in the Anglican Diocese of Huron, Ontario, Canada, where he was in charge of the Norfolk area of the diocese from 2009 until his retirement from active ministry December 31, 2015.

Dance was born in 1952, educated at the University of Western Ontario and ordained in 1977. After a curacy at St John the Evangelist, London, Ontario he served parishes in Chesley, Tara, Windsor and Simcoe.  He was also regional dean of Norfolk, archdeacon of Brant and dean of Huron.

References

1952 births
University of Western Ontario alumni
Anglican Church of Canada archdeacons
Deans of Huron
Anglican bishops of Huron
21st-century Anglican Church of Canada bishops
Living people